The 1988 Western Michigan Broncos football team was an American football team that represented Western Michigan University during the 1988 NCAA Division I-A football season. In their second season under head coach Al Molde, the Broncos compiled a 9–3 record, won the Mid-American Conference (MAC) championship, and lost to Fresno State in the 1988 California Bowl.

The win over Wisconsin at Camp Randall Stadium was Western Michigan's first ever over a Big Ten opponent in 12 attempts.  Western Michigan had previously defeated Michigan Agricultural College (Michigan State)  in 1917 and 1919, however those victories came prior to Michigan State's university status (1955) and Big Ten Conference membership (1953).

The team's statistical leaders were Tony Kimbrough with 2,831 passing yards, Robert Davis with 1,125 rushing yards, and Robert Oliver with 42 catches for 831 receiving yards. Kimbrough was selected as the MAC's most valuable player and the offensive player of the year. Offensive lineman Kevin Haverdink was selected by the Associated Press as a third-team All-American. Al Molde was named the MAC Coach of the Year.

Schedule

References

Western Michigan
Western Michigan Broncos football seasons
Mid-American Conference football champion seasons
Western Michigan Broncos football